Play Cell is the debut studio album by the American punk rock band Tilt. The album was released on June 4, 1993 through Lookout Records with the catalog number LK 071. It was the group's last release on Lookout! before the band signed to Fat Wreck Chords two years later. Play Cell also marks the last Tilt recording to feature bassist Pete Rypins, who left the group in 1994 and was replaced by Gabe Meline.

Track listing

Personnel
 Cinder Block – lead vocals
 Jeffrey Bischoff – guitar, backing vocals
 Pete Rypins – bass, backing vocals
 Vincent Camacho – drums

Production
 Mark Lemaire – production
 Kevin Army – engineering
 John Golden – mastering
 Alicia J. Rose and Cinder Block – cover art
 Idon Bryant – photography
 Sergie Loobkoff – graphic design

References

External links
Lookout Records album page

1993 debut albums
Tilt (band) albums
Lookout! Records albums